Welleran Poltarnees is the pen name of Harold Darling, an author who is best known for having written numerous "blessing books" that employ turn of the 20th century artwork.  This pen name is based on two of Lord Dunsany's most famous stories: The Sword of Welleran and Poltarnees, Beholder of Ocean.

Selected bibliography
The Baby Blessing
The Kindness Book
A Christmas Blessing (1996)
A House Blessing (1994)
A Blessing Of Healing And Strength
A Book for My Father
Sharing the Pleasures of Reading
An Irish Blessing for the Home (2005)
In Praise of Sailing (2004)
A Book of Unicorns (1978) (which includes many illustrators including Mercer Mayer).
The Happy Book
A Blessing of Music
A Birthday Blessing
Optimism
Weird and Wonderful: Discoveries from the Mysterious World of Forgotten Children's Books (2010)
All Mirrors are Magic Mirrors: Reflections on Pictures Found in Children's Books (1972)
Covering Christmas
Big Book of Christmas
Welcome Baby
This Is My Wish For You
Happiness
By The Sea
Hooray For Dogs
Hooray For Babies
I Love You
The Golden Rule
Invisible Art (The Art Brothers Welleran Poltanees, Richard Kehl and Cooper Edens)
In Praise of Sailing

References 

Spiritual writers
Year of birth missing (living people)
Living people